Jefferson Alveiro Cepeda Hernández (born 2 March 1996) is an Ecuadorian cyclist, who currently rides for UCI ProTeam . In October 2020, he was named in the startlist for the 2020 Vuelta a España.

He has qualified to represent Ecuador at the 2020 Summer Olympics.

Major results

2016
 1st Stage 5 Volta Ciclística Internacional do Rio Grande do Sul
 7th Overall Vuelta a Guatemala
1st  Mountains classification
2017
 1st  Road race, National Under–23 Road Championships
 Vuelta a Guatemala
1st  Mountains classification
1st Stage 5
 1st  Mountains classification Cascade Cycling Classic
 2nd Time trial, National Road Championships
2018
 1st  Road race, South American Games
 National Road Championships
1st  Road race
1st  Time trial
 3rd Overall Vuelta a Cantabria
2019
 1st  Road race, Pan American Road Championships
2020
 4th Prueba Villafranca de Ordizia
 6th Overall Vuelta a Murcia
2022
 3rd  Road race, Bolivarian Games
 8th Overall Tour of Romania
2023
 National Road Championships
2nd Time trial
2nd Road race

Grand Tour general classification results timeline

References

External links

1996 births
Living people
Ecuadorian male cyclists
Sportspeople from Quito
21st-century Ecuadorian people